Honest People is the nineteenth studio album (fiftieth album in total with live and compilation albums) by Australian country music artist John Williamson. It was released in July 2014 and peaked at number 11 on the ARIA Charts.

Track listing

Charts

Weekly charts

Year-end charts

Release history

References

2014 albums
John Williamson (singer) albums
Warner Music Group albums